Anandpur Sahib Lok Sabha constituency is one of the 13 Lok Sabha (parliamentary) constituencies of the Indian state of Punjab. This constituency came into existence as a part of the implementation of delimitation of parliamentary and assembly constituencies in 2008.

Assembly segments
The nine Vidhan Sabha (legislative assembly) segments of Anandpur Sahib Lok Sabha constituency are:

Before delimitation, Banga and Nawan Shahr assembly segments of this Lok Sabha constituency were in the Phillaur constituency, Chamkaur Sahib and Kharar assembly segments were in Ropar constituency and Garhshankar, Balachaur and Anandpur Sahib assembly segments were in Hoshiarpur constituency. S.A.S. Nagar assembly segment was created as a part of delimitation of assembly constituencies in 2008.

Members of Parliament

Election Results

General elections 2019

General elections 2014

General elections 2009

See also
 Ropar Lok Sabha constituency
 List of Constituencies of the Lok Sabha

Notes

External links
Anandpur Sahib lok sabha  constituency election 2019 result details

Lok Sabha constituencies in Punjab, India
Rupnagar district
Shaheed Bhagat Singh Nagar district